John Gollan (2 April 1911 – 5 September 1977) was a British political leader who was general secretary of the Communist Party of Great Britain (CPGB) from 1956 to 1975.

Biography 
Gollan was born in Edinburgh, where he grew up and took his first job as a painter's apprentice. His first introduction to political activity was during the 1926 general strike when he helped distribute the papers of the strike committee. He became a signwriter, but his career was cut short in July 1931 when he was arrested for distributing anti-militarist leaflets. He had been organising soldiers to demand better rights and conditions, an activity for which he was sentenced to 6 months in HM Prison Edinburgh. After a popular campaign calling for his release, he was freed in January 1932 and began working for the party.

Gollan became the editor of the 's newspaper The Young Worker and its successor publication Challenge. He then held various regional posts, before becoming the party's national organiser in 1945. In 1949, he became assistant editor of the Daily Worker, and in 1954 he became the party's Assistant General Secretary. 
 
In 1956, he became the party's General Secretary and immediately had to deal with the drop in membership following the Soviet crushing of the Hungarian Revolution. He held the post until 9 March 1975, when he resigned after being diagnosed with lung cancer, and died in 1977. He was cremated at Golders Green Crematorium.

References

External links 
 John Gollan Archive Marxists Internet Archive

1911 births
1977 deaths
20th-century Scottish politicians
Communist Party of Great Britain members
Leaders of political parties in the United Kingdom
Politicians from Edinburgh
Young Communist League of Britain members